Bill Jones (11 May 1887 – 26 October 1979) was an  Australian rules footballer who played with Geelong in the Victorian Football League (VFL).

Notes

External links 

1887 births
1979 deaths
Australian rules footballers from Victoria (Australia)
Geelong Football Club players